Asociación Atlética Quimsa, usually called simply Quimsa, is an Argentine sports club located in the city of Santiago del Estero in the homonymous province.

The club's professional basketball team plays in the Liga Nacional de Básquet (LNB), the top division of Argentine basketball, and Pan-America's premier men's basketball league, the Basketball Champions League Americas. Their home arena is the Estadio Ciudad de Santiago del Estero.

Apart from basketball, other activities hosted by the club are cestoball, roller skating, taekwondo and volleyball.

History
Founded in 1989, its name derives from the Quichua word kimsa, meaning three. The club was established as the merger of "Estudiantes Unidos", "Santiago Basketball Club" and "Inti Club", all three historical basketball clubs in Santiago.

In the 2002–03 season Quimsa achieved promotion to Torneo Nacional de Ascenso, the second division of national basketball. In the 2004–05 season, Quimsa played the final to promote, but they lost to La Unión in a playoff match after a 2–2 tie.

Quimsa reached the final in the following season, promoting to LNB although Quimsa also lost to Juventud Sionista, which crowned champion of the second division.

In their first season in the top level of Argentine basketball, Quimsa ended 9°, with 25 wins and 23 losses.

In November 2020, Quimsa won the final of the Basketball Champions League Americas (BCLA), beating Flamengo and being crowned champions of South America.

Players

Current roster

|

Retired numbers

Notes

Other players

 Nicolás Aguirre
 Quincy Alexander

Arena
Quimsa plays its home venues at Estadio Ciudad de Santiago del Estero, which have a capacity of 4,300. The stadium was originally used by Club Estudiantes Unidos, one of the three institution that merged to form Quimsa. With the money earned from the sales of Inti Club and Santiago Básquetbol Club (the other two clubs part of the merging), Quimsa refurbished the arena.

Honours
 Basketball Champions League Americas (1): 2019–20
 Liga Sudamericana (1): 2009 (II)
 Copa Argentina (1): 2009

References

External links
 
 Quimsa info and news on LNB

Basketball teams in Argentina
Basketball teams established in 1989
Santiago del Estero Province